Ugentse Gewog (Dzongkha: ཨྱོན་རྩེ་) is a gewog (village block) of Samtse District, Bhutan.

References

Gewogs of Bhutan
Samtse District